Norman Odale Campbell (born 24 November 1999) is a Jamaican professional footballer who plays as a forward for Serbian club Javor Ivanjica and the Jamaica national team.

Club career
Campbell trialed for Stoke City and almost signed for Udinese.

On 8 October 2020, Campbell signed with Serbian club Grafičar Beograd on loan from Harbour View. He made his professional debut with Grafičar in a 2–1 Serbian First League win over Budućnost Dobanovci on 26 October 2020.

International career
Campbell debuted with the Jamaica national team in a 3–0 friendly loss to Saudi Arabia on 14 November 2020.

References

External links
 
 

1999 births
Living people
Jamaican footballers
Association football forwards
Jamaica international footballers
National Premier League players
Serbian SuperLiga players
Serbian First League players
Harbour View F.C. players
RFK Grafičar Beograd players
FK Čukarički players
Jamaican expatriate footballers
Jamaican expatriate sportspeople in Serbia
Expatriate footballers in Serbia